The fifth season of Cheers, an American television sitcom, originally aired on NBC in the United States between September 25, 1986, and May 7, 1987. This season marks the departure of Shelley Long as Diane Chambers, bringing an end to the Sam and Diane relationship (although Long would return for the series finale). The show was created by director James Burrows and writers Glen and Les Charles (as Charles Burrows Charles Productions), in association with Paramount Television.

Background
After two seasons of struggle with low ratings and schedule shifts NBC's Best Night of Television on Television 1984–85 Thursday lineup, consisting of (from 8 pm Eastern) The Cosby Show, Family Ties, Cheers, Night Court and Hill Street Blues, was a ratings success. After two years with the same lineup, the crime series Hill Street Blues moved to Tuesdays in November 1986 to compete with Moonlighting, while the court series L.A. Law moved from Fridays to Hill Street Blues former slot. In April 1987 Nothing in Common replaced Night Court, which had moved to Wednesdays.

Before the season began, a telephone survey asked callers whom they thought Sam was calling in the last episode of the previous season: politician Janet Eldridge or his on-and-off girlfriend, Diane Chambers. Nearly 140 picked Diane, while almost 60 chose Janet. Callers who voted for either woman expected the love triangle to continue during this season, or felt that Sam and Diane should live happily ever after.

Cast and characters
 Ted Danson as Sam Malone – Womanizing ex-baseball player, bar owner and bartender
 Shelley Long as Diane Chambers – Sophisticated waitress
 Rhea Perlman as Carla Tortelli – Harsh waitress and divorced mother of six, who begins a relationship with Boston Bruins hockey player Eddie LeBec
 John Ratzenberger as Cliff Clavin – Postal worker and loquacious know-it-all bar patron, who continues to be unlucky with women
 Woody Harrelson as Woody Boyd – Dim bartender, originally from Indiana
 Kelsey Grammer as Frasier Crane – Psychiatrist and bar patron. He dates Lilith again, becomes engaged and moves in with her.
 George Wendt as Norm Peterson – Accountant and bar patron, who continues to change jobs frequently
 Bebe Neuwirth as Lilith Sternin – Psychiatrist and Frasier's fiancée

Notes

The first episode of the season reveals that it was Diane whom Sam had called; his proposal was rejected because Diane thought he was on the rebound from Janet. After rejecting a number of other proposals during the season, Diane accepts Sam's proposal after a judge compelled him to propose once more. Diane's ex-fiancé, Sumner Sloane, tells her one of his colleagues was impressed with her manuscript and forwarded it to a publisher. At their much-anticipated wedding, just before saying "I do" Sam and Diane receive the news that the publisher will give Diane a large advance to finish her book. They cancel the wedding, and Diane promises she will return in six months after finishing the book. Not knowing it is for the last time, Diane leaves Boston (and Cheers) behind.

Episodes
 

Specials

Production 

In January 1986, Shelley Long, who portrayed waitress Diane Chambers, announced her plans to leave the series when her contract would end, shortly before the beginning of the start of the sixth season. In December, she decided to leave her role as Diane to concentrate on her film career and family, while Ted Danson signed a contract for the next season (1987–1988) as Sam Malone. Rather than have them marry, the producers decided to separate Sam and Diane in the season finale and permanently end their romance. With Long's departure, the producers decided to find a female-lead replacement with a different appearance from Long's. They would also change Sam's character to one which was "more carefree" and "more of a goof-off", exploring his bachelorhood.

Three endings were filmed for the season finale, "I Do, Adieu", because it was possible that Long might decide to stay: 1) Sam and Diane become married; 2) Diane accepts an offer to finish a novel; 3) not revealed by the producers. The alternate ending in which Sam and Diane get married aired on May 27, 1998, as part of a 90-minute Fox special produced by the Paley Center called Behind the Laughs: The Untold Stories of Television's Favorite Comedies: A Museum of Television and Radio Special.

Reception
The series regularly aired on Thursdays at 9 pm ET (8 pm CT). As of April 22, 1987 Cheers was in third place, with an average 27.2 rating (23.8 million households) and an average 41 share. As of October 1, 1986, revenue from each commercial break was $230,000.

At the time of the original broadcast, Kathy Carlisle of the Los Angeles Times felt that Sam and Diane should have been married at the end of the season. On the other hand, Monica Collins of USA Today called Diane a friendless, "snitty, selfish snob" and was relieved to see her leave the series.

Jeffrey Robinson of DVD Talk later found this season a great improvement over the previous season and "highly recommended" its DVD set, rated its content four-and-a-half stars out of five and its replay value four out of five. Robinson found Woody Boyd improved over the previous season, and Diane's departure poorly-written but "sad". Adam Arseneau of DVD Verdict graded this season 96 percent and the acting 95. He found the humor well-aged, and praised Frasier and Lilith's storyline. Arseneau called Sam and Diane "slightly silly" this season, but found Diane's departure "heartbreaking". He rated "Cheers: the Motion Picture" and "Dinner at Eight-ish" his all-time favorite episodes of the series.

Nate Meyers of Digitally Obsessed! graded this season's style "A−" and substance an "A", for memorable moments such as the season-finale wedding. He praised Lilith's appearances, finding her "poorly handled" since she appeared in only two episodes this season. He praised the humor as well-aged, not topical (apart from references to then-President Ronald Reagan and the Soviet Union) and "rarely forced". TV Guide ranked "Thanksgiving Orphans" number seven on its "100 Greatest Episodes of All Time" list. The A.V. Club highlighted its food fighting scene as one of notorious moments of the episode. IGN called "Thanksgiving Orphans" the fourth best Cheers episode and topped the season finale "I Do, Adieu" in the list. The Guardian television critic Stephen Kelly panned the writing of "Chambers vs. Malone", which Kelly considered "one of the worst episodes."

Accolades 
In 1987, John Cleese won an Emmy as Outstanding Guest Performer in a Comedy Series for playing Simon Finch-Royce in "Simon Says" (1987). Michael Ballin, Bob Douglass, Doug Gray and Thomas J. Huth received Emmys for Outstanding Sound Mixing for a Comedy Series for the season premiere, "The Proposal" (1986).

DVD release
The season is available on DVD in a four-disc box set. Like the prior season's DVD release, the set lacks special features such as outtakes and commentary.

Notes

References

First-run ratings notes
According to the 15 May 1987 article from The Argus-Press, the 1986-87 ratings were based on  87.4 million households with at least one television set. Unless otherwise, the sources were of the newspaper Pittsburgh Post-Gazette.

External links 
 Production order of Cheers (season 5) at Copyright Catalog
 Click "Set Search Limits", select "Range", select "Motion Pictures" at "Item Type", type "1986" at left box and "1987" at right box, either hit "Enter" or click "Set Search Limits"
 Then, after above step, search by title, type "Cheers", and hit "Enter" or click "Begin search"
 Cheers, season 5 at Internet Movie Database
 Cheers, season 5 at TV Guide
Cheers, season 5 at Rotten Tomatoes

5
1986 American television seasons
1987 American television seasons
Bjorklund|2014|